Niviventer is a genus of rodent in the family Muridae endemic to Southeast Asia. It contains the following species:
 Anderson's white-bellied rat, Niviventer andersoni
 Brahma white-bellied rat, Niviventer brahma
 Niviventer bukit 
 Cameron Highlands white-bellied rat, Niviventer cameroni
 Chinese white-bellied rat, Niviventer confucianus
 Coxing's white-bellied rat, Niviventer coninga
 Dark-tailed tree rat, Niviventer cremoriventer
 Oldfield white-bellied rat, Niviventer culturatus
 Smoke-bellied rat, Niviventer eha
 Large white-bellied rat, Niviventer excelsior
 Tibetan white-bellied rat, Niviventer fengi 
 Montane Sumatran white-bellied rat, Niviventer fraternus
 Chestnut white-bellied rat, Niviventer fulvescens
 Limestone rat, Niviventer hinpoon
 Niviventer huang  
 Lang Bian white-bellied rat, Niviventer langbianis
 Narrow-tailed white-bellied rat, Niviventer lepturus
 Hainan white-bellied rat, Niviventer lotipes (Allen, 1926) (formerly in N. tenaster)
 Mekong white-bellied rat, Niviventer mekongis 
 White-bellied rat, Niviventer niviventer
 Long-tailed mountain rat, Niviventer rapit
 Tenasserim white-bellied rat, Niviventer tenaster

References

 
Rodent genera
Taxonomy articles created by Polbot